Charles and Edith Liedlich House is a historic home located near Newark, New Castle County, Delaware.  It was built about 1919, and is a -story, rectangular wood frame dwelling in the American Craftsman / Bungalow style.  It sits on a rubble stone foundation and has a side gable roof with dormers.  It has an enclosed porch with sleeping porch above.  Also on the property is a contributing -story stucco and shingled garage.

It was added to the National Register of Historic Places in 2006.

References

Houses on the National Register of Historic Places in Delaware
Houses completed in 1919
Houses in New Castle County, Delaware
National Register of Historic Places in New Castle County, Delaware